The Mercat de Sant Josep de la Boqueria, often simply referred to as La Boqueria, is a large public market in the Ciutat Vella district of Barcelona, Catalonia, Spain, and one of the city's foremost tourist landmarks, with an entrance from La Rambla, not far from the Liceu, Barcelona's opera house. The market has a very diverse selection of goods.

Transport
Barcelona Metro – Liceu (on L3).
Barcelona Bus – Lines 14, 59 and 91.

History

The first mention of the Boqueria market in Barcelona dates from 1217, when tables were installed near the old city gate to sell meat. From December 1470 onwards, a pig market was held at this site; at this time it was known as Mercadi Bornet. Later, until 1794, it was known simply as Mercat de la Palla, or straw market. In the beginning, the market was not enclosed and had no official status, being regarded simply as an extension of the Plaça Nova market, which extended to the Plaça del Pi. The current name is believed to derive from the Catalan , meaning "goat", therefore a boqueria would be a place where goat meat is sold; compare also French , whence Vucciria, the name of a market in Palermo, Italy.

Later, the authorities decided to construct a separate market on La Rambla, housing mainly fishmongers and butchers. It was not until 1826 that the market was legally recognized, and a convention held in 1835, decided to build an official structure. Construction began on March 19, 1840, under the direction of architect Mas Vilá. The market officially opened in the same year, but the plans for the building were modified many times. The inauguration of the structure finally took place in 1853. A new fish market opened in 1911, and the metal roof that still exists today was constructed in 1914.

See also
List of markets in Barcelona

References

External links

Mercat de la Boqueria 
Boqueria Market Tours Food and Culinary tours in the La Boqueria Market

History of Barcelona
Economy of Barcelona
Buildings and structures in Barcelona
Tourist attractions in Barcelona
Retail markets in Barcelona
Ciutat Vella
La Rambla, Barcelona
Barcelona
Catalonia
El Raval
1840 in Spain